Alex Magno may refer to:

 Alex Magno (political scientist), political scientist and academic in the Philippines
 Alex Magno (choreographer), Brazilian-born choreographer and director